Tracy Ann Newman (born December 12, 1942) is an American television producer, writer, comedian and musician. Newman is a founding member of  the improvisational theater troupe The Groundlings (as is her sister, Laraine Newman). She was co-creator and executive producer of the sitcom According to Jim (2001–2009). She is also a singer - songwriter, as well as an early member of The New Christy Minstrels and lead singer of Tracy Newman and The Reinforcements. She is the mother of artist/writer Charlotte Dean, with whom she co-directs the live comedy show Charlotte's Shorts.

TV career

With writing partner Jonathan Stark, Newman's credits include Cheers, The Nanny, The Drew Carey Show and Ellen for which she won a Primetime Emmy Award for co-writing "The Puppy Episode". and a Peabody Award. In 2001, Newman and Stark created the sitcom According to Jim starring Jim Belushi.

Music career
Newman is the lead singer/songwriter of the folk music band Tracy Newman and the Reinforcements. In 2007, she released the album A Place in the Sun. Her second album, I Just See You, was released in 2012. Her third album, I Can Swing Forever, was released in 2014.  It is for children and was released with a colouring book done by her daughter, Charlotte Dean.

Radio and podcast appearances
Newman appeared on Ken Reid's TV Guidance Counselor podcast on October 11, 2016. On August 15, 2019, Newman guested on Mark Malkoff's The Carson Podcast.

Filmography

What’s New (1965) (TV, Filmed at Brooklyn College) (WNET)
They Came from Outer Space (1990) (TV)
Cheers (1991–1992) (TV)
Bob (1992–1993) (TV)
The Nanny (1994) (TV)
The Barefoot Executive (with Jonathan Stark and Tim Doyle) (1995) (TV)
Ellen (1995–1997) (TV)
Hiller and Diller (1998) (TV)
The Drew Carey Show (1999) (TV)
According to Jim (2001–2009) (TV) (Creator)

Discography
A Place in the Sun
I Just See You
I Can Swing Forever
Shoebox Town
Sing With Me
That's What Love Can Do to Your Heart

References

External links

Living people
Place of birth missing (living people)
People from Los Angeles
Screenwriters from Arizona
Screenwriters from California
Singer-songwriters from California
Television producers from California
American television writers
American women television producers
American women television writers
Jewish American screenwriters
Jewish American songwriters
Primetime Emmy Award winners
University of Arizona alumni
The New Christy Minstrels members
21st-century American Jews
21st-century American women
1942 births